The 2013–14 New Mexico Lobos women's basketball team represented the University of New Mexico during the 2013–14 NCAA Division I women's basketball season. The Lobos, led by third year head coach Yvonne Sanchez, played play their home games at The Pit and were members of the Mountain West Conference.

2013–14 Roster

Schedule and results

|-
! colspan=9| Exhibition

|-
! colspan=9| Regular Season

|-
!colspan=9| 2014 Mountain West Conference women's basketball tournament

See also
2013–14 New Mexico Lobos men's basketball team

References 

New Mexico
2013 in sports in New Mexico
2014 in sports in New Mexico
New Mexico Lobos women's basketball seasons